The Daredevils was a comics magazine and anthology published by Marvel UK in 1983. Aimed for a more sophisticated audience than typical light superhero adventures, The Daredevils featured Captain Britain stories by Alan Moore and Alan Davis, as well as new Night Raven text stories, and reprints of Frank Miller's Daredevil stories. In addition to these regular features, it also included some Spider-Man stories, occasional one-off comic stories, and a variety of text articles.

The title lasted eleven issues before merging with The Mighty World of Marvel.

Regular features
Aside from the occasional pull-out posters, all contents were printed in black-and-white, not colour.

 Captain Britain — always the first story in any issue, Captain Britain had just started the "Jaspers' Warp" storyline when the series transferred to The Daredevils. It appeared in every issue.
 Daredevil — the Frank Miller Daredevil run was reprinted in The Daredevils, giving the series its title. Several of the covers also featured Daredevil. 
 Night Raven — The Daredevils included Night Raven text stories in #6-11, written by Alan Moore with illustrations by Alan Davis.
 Spider-Man — a number of early Spider-Man stories were reprinted in the first few issues.

Other features
Daredevils also included other features, often written by Alan Moore:

Reprints of Moore's Time War — originally printed in Doctor Who Monthly to coincide with the appearance of the Special Executive in Captain Britain. The same issue also included a poster of the team and a single page article by Moore that provided background on their creation.
"Early Artwork" — profiles of artists including Garry Leach, Jerry Paris, John Higgins, Dave Gibbons and Alan Davis.
Nonfiction articles — a number of which were written by Moore but also featured an article by Steve Moore on Hong Kong comics.
"News Feature" — looking at upcoming Marvel Comics titles, written by Frank Plowright. It briefly became "Comics Publishing Boom," which looked at the news from the various American comics publishers.
"Fanzine Reviews" — written by Moore.
A letters page
"Comic Mart" — where readers could post the comics they had on offer and those they wanted.

Notes

References

The Daredevils at The Unofficial Handbook of Marvel Comics Creators
The Daredevils at the Big Comic Book DataBase

Comics anthologies
Marvel UK titles
1983 comics debuts